Joseph Kershaw may refer to:
 Joseph B. Kershaw, South Carolina planter, slaveholder, lawyer, judge, and Confederate general
 Joseph Franklin Kershaw, English artist

See also
 Joe Lang Kershaw, member of the Florida House of Representatives